Mary Pat Flaherty (born 1955) is an American journalist who specializes in investigative and long-range stories. She has won numerous national awards, including the Pulitzer Prize for Specialized Reporting. Formerly of the Pittsburgh Press, she has worked for the Washington Post since 1993.

Biography 

Flaherty was born in Pittsburgh, Pennsylvania, on May 7, 1955, to Patrick and Mary Lydon Flaherty. She attended Northwestern University's Medill School of Journalism, receiving a B.S. in journalism in 1977. She worked for the Pittsburgh Press as an intern in 1975. After graduating she became a reporter at the paper, and later an editor.

In 1986, she and Andrew Schneider won the Pulitzer Prize for Specialized Reporting for a series titled "The Challenge of a Miracle: Selling the Gift." Flaherty and Schneider began publishing the 13-article series in November 1985 after 10 months of investigation into the United States's kidney transplant system and its abuse by wealthy foreign nationals, who bypassed the long wait lists. She collaborated with Schneider again on a 1991 series on asset seizure and forfeiture titled Presumed Guilty: The Law's Victims in the War on Drugs.

In 1993 she went to work for the Washington Post as an investigative projects editor, returning to investigative reporting in 2000. She was a finalist for the 1995 Pulitzer Prize for Investigative Reporting with Keith A. Harriston for a series of articles on the hiring practices of the Washington D.C. Police Department.

In 2001 Flaherty, along with Joe Stephens, Deborah Nelson, Karen DeYoung, John Pomfret, Sharon LaFraniere and Doug Struck, wrote a six-part Washington Post investigative series titled "The Body Hunters," on American drug companies conducting tests in Third World countries. The series won the investigative reporting award from the Society of Professional Journalists and the Malcolm Forbes Award for international business reporting from the Overseas Press Club of America.

Other notable stories Flaherty has worked on include a 2001 report on faulty testing of the Bell Boeing V-22 Osprey Marine helicopter and a 2013 exposé of massive losses from fraud and embezzlements at nonprofit organizations.

In 2014 she was inducted into the Medill School of Journalism Hall of Achievement. She has also won George Polk Awards and SDX national awards.

Awards 
 1986 Pulitzer Prize for Specialized Reporting, with Andrew Schneider
 Golden Quill Award, Western Pennsylvania Newspaper Association
 Keystone Press Newspaper Publishers' Association
 George Polk Memorial Award, Long Island University, NY, 1992
 Sigma Delta Chi Award, 1992
 Series Reporting Award, Maryland-Delaware-DC Press Association, 1995
 Finalist, 1995 Pulitzer Prize for Investigative Reporting, with Keith A. Harriston
 Investigative Reporting Award, Society of Professional Journalists, 2001
 Malcolm Forbes Award, Overseas Press Club, 2001

References

External links 
 Mary Pat Flaherty at the Washington Post
 
 

1955 births
American newspaper journalists
Journalists from Pennsylvania
Pulitzer Prize winners for journalism
George Polk Award recipients
Medill School of Journalism alumni
The Washington Post people
Writers from Pittsburgh
American women journalists
20th-century American journalists
20th-century American women writers
21st-century American journalists
21st-century American women writers
Living people
Pulitzer Prize for Beat Reporting winners